"Thru' These Walls" is a song by the English drummer Phil Collins. It was released as a single in October 1982, being Collins' fourth single. The song is also the seventh track and first single release from Collins' second solo studio album, Hello, I Must Be Going!, released in November of the same year. The song is dark, which follows a vast majority of songs from the album, and is about a man listening through the wall to his neighbours partaking in sexual activities.

Recording
The song has distinct similarities to Collins's debut solo single, "In The Air Tonight", featuring similar atmospheric opening chords on a Sequential Circuits Prophet-5 and also using the same gated reverb drum effect. The song also features one of Collins's attempts at a "Ringo Starr drum part", Starr being one of his biggest influences as a drummer.

Release
The song was the first single by Collins that did not reach the Top 20 in the UK, peaking at No. 56 in the UK Singles Chart (it was not released as a single in the U.S.)

Music video
The music video for the song was directed by Stuart Orme, who also directed the video for "In The Air Tonight" and in 1983 it was released on the home video Phil Collins available on Video Home System (VHS) and LaserDisc (LD) which received a Grammy nomination for Best Video, Short Form.

Although the video appeared on Phil Collins "The Singles Collection" VHS, the music video itself did not appear officially for Internet streaming on Phil Collins' YouTube channel until June 2018.

Track listing
7": Virgin / VS 524 (UK)
 "Thru' These Walls"
 "Do You Know, Do You Care?"

Chart history

Credits 
"Thru' These Walls"
 Phil Collins – keyboards, drums, vocals, marimba 
 Daryl Stuermer – guitars
 Mo Foster – bass 
"Do You Know, Do You Care?"
 Phil Collins – vocals, keyboards, bass pedals, drums, timpani, trumpet
 Daryl Stuermer – guitars
 Gavin Cochrane – photography

References 

1982 singles
Phil Collins songs
Songs written by Phil Collins
Virgin Records singles
Song recordings produced by Hugh Padgham
Song recordings produced by Phil Collins
1982 songs